Apeel Sciences is a company based in Goleta, California whose edible coating product Apeel  can make avocados, citrus and other types of fruit last twice as long as usual by using a tasteless edible coating made from plant materials. The coating's formulation can be modified for strawberries, mangoes, apples, bananas, kumquats, citrus, and asparagus.

Founding
Apeel was founded in 2012 by James Rogers, after receiving a $100,000 grant from the Bill and Melinda Gates Foundation to help reduce post-harvest food waste in developing countries that lacked refrigeration infrastructure.

After the initial grant, backing has been provided by Microsoft cofounder Bill Gates and venture capitalist firm Andreessen Horowitz.  Apeel has raised $110 million in financing to date.

See also
Edible packaging

References

External links
 

2012 establishments in California